Rajula is one of the 182 Legislative Assembly constituencies of Gujarat state in India. It is part of Amreli district.

List of segments

This assembly seat represents the following segments,

 Rajula Taluka – Entire taluka except village – Rampara No-1
 Jafrabad Taluka
 Khambha Taluka (Part) Villages – Dedan, Raningpara, Nava Malaknes, Borala, Babarpur, Kantala, Chakrava, Hanumanpur, Juna Malaknes, Nesdi No-2, Samadhiyala No-2, Jivapar, Munjiyasar, Trakuda, Vangadhara, Talda, Dadli, Dhundhavana, Pachapachiya, Salva, Pipariya, Rabarika, Ambaliyala, Jamka, Ningala No-2, Bhundani, Gorana, Katarpara, Barman Mota, Barman Nana

Members of Legislative Assembly

Election results

2022 
 

<

2017

2012

See also
 List of constituencies of Gujarat Legislative Assembly
 Gujarat Legislative Assembly

References

External links
 

Assembly constituencies of Gujarat
Amreli district